The Baker Canyon Fire was wildfire that began on March 3, 2016 northeast of Douglas, Arizona. By the time the fire was contained it had burned  of land in both Arizona and New Mexico.

References

Wildfires in Arizona
2016 Arizona wildfires
Coronado National Forest
2016 in Arizona